Major Philip Humphrey Peter Weaver (12 March 1912 – 28 June 1991) was an English first-class cricketer. Weaver was a right-handed batsman who bowled right-arm medium pace.

Weaver was educated at King's School, Bruton, although Dyslexia had prevented him from attending one of the more fashionable schools of the time.

Weaver made two first-class appearances for Hampshire in the 1938 County Championship against Glamorgan and his second and final first-class match against Cambridge University, in which he made his highest first-class score of 37.

In the Second World War Weaver served with the SAS, where he made the rank of Major.

Weaver died at Poole, Dorset on 28 June 1991.

External links
Philip Weaver at Cricinfo
Philip Weaver at CricketArchive

1912 births
1991 deaths
People from West Bengal
English cricketers
Hampshire cricketers
Special Air Service officers
Dorset Regiment officers
British Army personnel of World War II
People educated at King's School, Bruton